Edmonton's International Beerfest (Edmonton BeerFest, International BeerFest, BeerFest Edmonton Beer Festival ) is an annual two-day beer and food festival held in early spring in Edmonton, Alberta, Canada.   Gaining national and international recognition for its size, attendance, entertainment and beer school.    

The festival allows patrons to sample beers, lagers and ales from around the globe brought in by different vendors, microbreweries, and pubs from around the world, with a large focus on  Alberta and Canada.

The Festival includes: 

 Live entertainment on multiple stage
 10-20 bands 
 Magicians
 Professional Hula hoop
 Aerialist
 Acrobats
 Contortionists 
 Jugglers 
 Fire Spinners
 Stilt Walkers 
 Beer School
 Craft Beer Village 
 Games 
 Food Trucks 
 Food and Beer Pairing
 Brewers 
 Breweries 
 Beer Judges 
 Celebrity Chefs 
 Restaurants 
 Hundreds of Beers from around the world 

The first events sold out. As a result, the organizers relocated the festival to the Shaw Conference Centre.  Since March 2007, the event has been held annually at the Convention Centre in downtown Edmonton.   

Edmonton's International Beerfest has won Vue Weekly's Golden Fork Awards for best Beverage Festival/Event in both 2014 and 2015. Beerfest has received runner up in the same category in 2016, 2017, and 2018.

Each year, approximately 25,000 people attend the event over its two-day span.

Currently Scheduled for March 24,25 2023 at The Convention Centre

See also  
Festivals in Edmonton
Explore Edmonton
Best Beer Festvals 
Todo Canada
All Events
Canadian Beer News

References 

Beer festivals in Canada

Beerfest
Alcohol in Alberta